Week is a small village in the civil parish of Chulmleigh, in the North Devon district of Devon, England.

 

Villages in Devon
Chulmleigh